Express, Inc. is an American fashion retailer that caters mainly to young men and women. The company is headquartered in Columbus, Ohio. Express operates 500+ stores in the United States, Puerto Rico, Mexico, Costa Rica, Panama, El Salvador and Guatemala. 

Express, Inc. consists of the brands Express and UpWest, and is traded on the New York Stock Exchange under the symbol EXPR.

In 2022, the company was named in the Forbes Top 500 as #357 America's Best Large Employers 2022 and also #80 as Best Employers for Diversity 2022

History
Limited Brands, in 1980, opened the first Express store, as women's clothier "Limited Express" in Chicago's Water Tower Place. Former CEO Michael Weiss joined the brand in 1981 when the test expanded to include eight stores. By 1986, Express had 250 stores and began testing the sale of men's merchandise in 16 stores the following year. The men's fashion line was spun off into its own brand, Structure, in 1989.

In 2001, Express became a dual gender brand with the reintegration of its Structure stores as "Express Men". Dual gender Express stores began opening the following year.  Structure apparel brand was sold to Sears in 2003.

In November 2019, Express announced spinoff UpWest, a DTC lifestyle brand geared towards health, wellness, and sustainability. With the launch of UpWest also came its philanthropic arm, The UpWest Foundation, which will donate 1% of total sales up to $1million towards Mental Health America, Random Acts and Freedom Dogs of America.

Express as a privately held company
On May 16, 2007, Limited Brands announced its intent to sell a 67% stake in Express to an affiliate of a private equity firm called Golden Gate Capital Partners, based in San Francisco. When the sale was finalized in July 2007, Golden Gate's stake in the company was 75% instead of the announced 67%.

On May 13, 2010, the company sold 16 million shares for $17 each, raising about $272 million. Shares had been planned to sell between $18 and $20 each. On May 14, 2010, the shares opened at $17 to $16.50 before recovering slightly to close down 1.5% at $16.75 on the New York Stock Exchange.

Since the IPO, Golden Gate and Limited Brands gradually reduced their ownership interest in the Company. On July 29, 2011, Limited Brands sold its remaining ownership interest in the Company, and as a result of this disposition, ceased to be a related party as of the end of the second quarter of 2011. On March 19, 2012, Golden Gate sold its remaining ownership interest in the Company, and as of May 31, 2012, Golden Gate no longer had representation on the Board. As a result of the disposition and Board seat removal, Golden Gate ceased to be a related party as of June 1, 2012.

Design studio
Express clothes are designed at the Express Design Studio on 111 Fifth Avenue New York City, New York in Manhattan's Flatiron District.

References

External links 

2010 initial public offerings
American companies established in 1980
Clothing retailers of the United States
Clothing brands of the United States
Companies based in the Columbus, Ohio metropolitan area
Companies listed on the New York Stock Exchange
Defunct retail companies of Canada
Retail companies established in 1980